Ishizu is a Japanese surname. Notable people with the surname include:

, Japanese voice actress
, Japanese football player
, Japanese archer
, Japanese discus and javelin thrower
, Japanese photographer
, Japanese tennis player
, Japanese archer

See also
 Ishizu Station (Gifu), a railway station in Kaizu, Gifu Prefecture, Japan

Japanese-language surnames